This is a list of shipwrecks located in or around the continent of Africa.

East Africa

Eritrea

Kenya

Mozambique

Somalia

Tanzania

Lake Victoria

Lake Albert

Madagascar

North Africa

Algeria

Egypt

Libya

Morocco/Western Sahara

Tunisia

Southern Africa

Malawi

Namibia

South Africa

Eastern Cape

Natal

Western Cape

West Africa

References

External links
 WRECKSITE Worldwide database of + 65,000 wrecks with history, maritime charts and GPS positions (subscription required)
 South African shipwrecks
 List of Shipwrecks Located Along the Coast of the Overberg District Municipal Area

 

Africa
Shipwrecks